Heart of the City is the fourth album by the Spanish group Barrabás, released in 1975. The album charted at #149 on the Billboard 200 in the USA, and was later re-released on CD in Spain as Check Mate.

This album was the first to feature Daniel Louis on drums, after the departure of José María Moll.

"Checkmate" / "Family Size" and "Make It Easy" / "Take a Wild Ride" were released as singles. The instrumental "Mellow Blow" was one of the first 12-inch singles to be released, and the first ever on Atlantic Records.

Track listing
"Checkmate" (Fernando Arbex) – 4:28
"Take a Wild Ride" (E. Morales, M. Morales, Ernesto Duarte, Daniel Louis) – 4:00
"Along the Shore" (Duarte, José Luís Tejada) – 6:06
"Make It Easy" (E. Morales, M. Morales) – 3:54
"Family Size" (Arbex) – 3:21
"Mellow Blow" (E. Morales) – 4:12
"Thank You Love" (E. Morales, M. Morales) – 4:45
"Four Season Woman" (Arbex) – 3:57

Personnel
José Luís Tejada – lead vocals
Enrique "Ricky" Morales – lead and acoustic guitars, backing vocals
Miguel Morales – bass guitar, rhythm and acoustic guitars, backing vocals
Ernesto "Tito" Duarte – saxophone, flute, percussion, bass guitar
Juan Vidal – keyboards, backing vocals
Daniel Louis – drums, percussion
"The Waters" (Maxine, Julia & Patti) – backing vocals
Produced by Fernando Arbex
Recorded at Blue Rock Studios, New York

Release information
Spain – Ariola Eurodisc
Germany – Ariola 89 267 XOT
USA & Canada – Atco SD 36-118
Italy – Atlantic W50165
Disconforme DISC 1993CD (2001 CD) – (as Check Mate)
Wounded Bird WOBR6118 (2008 CD)

References

1975 albums
Barrabás albums